Oracle is a recording by guitarist Michael Hedges released on the Windham Hill label. It won the 1998 Grammy Award for Best New Age Album. Oracle peaked at #7 on the Billboard New Age Album charts.

The album was reissued in 2009 by Valley Entertainment.

Reception

Music critic Jason Anderson, writing for Allmusic, wrote the album "On an album that is mostly instrumental and generally concerned more with melody than thematic cohesion and quirky technical breakthroughs, Hedges relies on his past offerings and simplest musical instincts for inspiration, and the results are splendid... this offering is consistent in its quality, and rare in its musical commitment."

Track listing
All compositions by Michael Hedges except as noted.
"Greensleeves" was not listed in the liner notes. It was originally recorded for The Windham Hill sampler Carols of Christmas.

 "The 2nd Law" – 3:07
 "Ignition" – 3:28
 "Baal T'Shuvah" – 2:10
 "Dirge" – 3:29
 "Jitterboogie" – 2:37
 "Oracle" – 4:08
 "Gospel" – 2:22
 "Tomorrow Never Knows" (Lennon–McCartney) – 4:01
 "Theme From Hatari" (Henry Mancini) – 3:19
 "Aura Müünta" – 2:58
 "Jitterboogie (Family version)" – 2:09
 "Sofa No. 1" (Frank Zappa) – 2:42
 "When I Was 4" – 4:19
 "Greensleeves" (Traditional) – 3:08

Personnel
Michael Hedges – guitar, bass, harp guitar, synthesizers, harmonica, vocals, alto flute
Michael Manring – fretless bass

Production notes
Produced by Michael Hedges
Engineered by Rob Griffin + Michael Hedges
Mastered by Bernie Grundman

References 

1996 albums
Grammy Award for Best New Age Album
Michael Hedges albums
Windham Hill Records albums